The Central League was a Class C league of minor league baseball that operated in the United States in 1897. Representatives met to organize in Evansville, Indiana, on January 20, 1897. George Simmons was elected president, secretary, and treasurer. While the exact league lineup was not finalized at the meeting, it was resolved that the circuit was to consist of six teams who would pay a $500 deposit to guarantee they would play the entire season, and player salaries were capped at $900 per team. Officials met again on February 7 in Evansville to solidify the league's membership, and franchises were granted to clubs in Cairo, Illinois; Evansville, Terre Haute, and Washington, Indiana; Paducah, Kentucky; and Nashville, Tennessee. 

It was reported the Nashville Centennials franchise relocated on June 4, 1897.

Severe financial problems throughout the circuit forced the league to disband on July 20. As of July 19, the final day of play, the Evansville Brewers were in first place with a 41–30 (.577) record, making them the de facto league champions.

League standings

References

Baseball leagues in Illinois
Baseball leagues in Indiana
Baseball leagues in Kentucky
Baseball leagues in Tennessee
Defunct minor baseball leagues in the United States
Sports leagues established in 1897
Sports leagues disestablished in 1897